Partners of the Trail is a 1931 American Western film directed by Wallace Fox and starring Tom Tyler, Betty Mack and Lafe McKee.

Cast
 Tom Tyler as Larry Condon 
 Betty Mack as Ruby Gerard 
 Lafe McKee as Sheriff McWade 
 Reginald Sheffield as John Durant 
 Horace B. Carpenter as Skeets Briggs 
 Patrick Rooney as Burke 
 Marguerite McWade as Mary Lopez

References

Bibliography
 Pitts, Michael R. Western Movies: A Guide to 5,105 Feature Films. McFarland, 2012.

External links
 

1931 films
1931 Western (genre) films
American Western (genre) films
Films directed by Wallace Fox
Monogram Pictures films
American black-and-white films
1930s English-language films
1930s American films